Stéphane Peterhansel (born 6 August 1965 in Échenoz-la-Méline, Haute-Saône) is a rally driver from France. He holds the record for wins at the Dakar Rally, with 14 victories. In the 2018 season he was one of the official drivers of the Team Peugeot Total.

Biography
Peterhansel made his Paris to Dakar Rally debut in 1988 in the motorcycle category for Yamaha, later winning the event in 1991, 1992, 1993, 1995, 1997, and 1998. He switched to the car category for 1999, joining the works Mitsubishi in 2003.  He went on to win the event for the Japanese marque in 2004, 2005 and 2007, and took his 11th victory in 2013 driving an X-Raid prepared Mini Countryman – making him the most successful competitor in the history of the Dakar Rally. In 2014 he was leading the Dakar in the final stage, but was controversially ordered to allow his team-mate, Nani Roma, to overtake and win - leaving himself to finish in second place. In 2015 he joined Peugeot as the manufacturer returned to compete in the Dakar for the first time since 1990. He took his 12th and 13th Dakar victory in 2016 and 2017.
He competed in the Race of Champions in 2005 and 2006 and is also a two-time World Enduro Champion. From 1999 to 2018, his Dakar co-driver was Jean-Paul Cottret.

He also competed in the 2018 Rallye du Maroc in the UTV category with a Yamaha YXZ with his wife Andrea Mayer as his co-driver.

Since the 2018 Baja Portalegre 500, Peterhansel and Cyril Despres have swapped their co-drivers, making David Castera as Peterhansel's co-driver and Cottret the co-driver for Despres.

Dakar Rally

Other honours

References

External links
 
 Driver profile at Monster Energy website

1965 births
Living people
Sportspeople from Haute-Saône
Enduro riders
French rally drivers
French motorcycle racers
Off-road racing drivers
Dakar Rally drivers
Dakar Rally motorcyclists
Dakar Rally winning drivers
Off-road motorcycle racers
Audi Sport drivers
Peugeot Sport drivers